A list of films produced in the Tollywood Telugu language film industry split by year of release in the 2020s.

 List of Telugu films of 2020
List of Telugu films of 2021
List of Telugu films of 2022
List of Telugu films of 2023

See also 

 Lists of Telugu-language films